Michael John Ellis (born 3 September 1936 in London, Greater London) was an Olympic athlete from England.

Athletics career
He specialised in the hammer throw events during his career. Ellis represented Great Britain at the 1960 Olympic Games.

He represented England and claimed the gold medal for England in the men's hammer throw event at the 1958 British Empire and Commonwealth Games in Cardiff, Wales. Just before those games, he was one of many signatories in a letter to The Times on 17 July 1958 opposing 'the policy of apartheid' in international sport and defending 'the principle of racial equality which is embodied in the Declaration of the Olympic Games'.<ref>Brown and Hogsbjerg, Apartheid is not a game, 16</ref>

References

 Brown, Geoff and Hogsbjerg, Christian. Apartheid is not a Game: Remembering the Stop the Seventy Tour campaign.'' London: Redwords, 2020. .

1936 births
Living people
English male hammer throwers
British male hammer throwers
Olympic athletes of Great Britain
Athletes (track and field) at the 1960 Summer Olympics
Athletes (track and field) at the 1958 British Empire and Commonwealth Games
Commonwealth Games gold medallists for England
Commonwealth Games medallists in athletics
Athletes from London
Medallists at the 1958 British Empire and Commonwealth Games